Doty is a ghost town in Boyd County, Nebraska, United States.

History
A post office was established at Doty in 1881, and remained in operation until it was discontinued in 1902.

References

Geography of Boyd County, Nebraska